Greek National Road 3 (abbreviated as EO3) is a single carriageway road in Greece. It connects Elefsina near Athens with the border of North Macedonia at Niki. It passes through Larissa and Florina. At Niki, it connects with the M5K motorway to Bitola. The section Kozani - Niki is also designated as the A27 motorway, part of which is operational as a 2-lane motorway.

Greek National Road 3 is one of the longest national roads in Greece and until the 1960s it served as the main route from Larissa to Thessaloniki. The new A1 motorway now offers a faster connection to Thessaloniki. Most of the EO3, except the southernmost section between Eleusis and Bralos, is part of the E65.

Future developments
Throughout the late 1980s, motorway bypasses were constructed at the towns of Tyrnavos and Elassonas, but in 2002 plans surfaced to convert all of the road into a new motorway, from Larissa to Kozani and further on to Bitola, in North Macedonia. Throughout the 2000s motorway sections were delivered to the public and are running north of Larissa and north of Kozani, up to Ptolemaida. Remaining parts have either fallen through, as no construction works are currently being undertaken and no further announcements have been delivered by the government.

Route
The highway passes through and along the following places:

Elefsina 
Mandra
Thebes
Livadeia
Lamia (bypass)
Farsala
Larissa
Tyrnavos (bypass)
Elassona (bypass)
Kozani (bypass)
Ptolemaida (bypass)
Florina
Niki

3
Roads in Attica
Roads in Central Greece
Roads in Thessaly
Roads in Western Macedonia